Cirrochroa, commonly called yeomen, is a genus of butterflies of the subfamily Heliconiinae in the family Nymphalidae found in southeast Asia. The genus ranges from India to New Guinea.

Species
In alphabetical order:
 Cirrochroa aoris Doubleday, 1847 – large yeoman
 Cirrochroa clagia (Godart, 1824)
 Cirrochroa emalea (Guérin-Méneville, 1843) – Malay yeoman
 Cirrochroa eremita Tsukada, 1985
 Cirrochroa imperatrix Grose-Smith, 1894
 Cirrochroa malaya C. & R. Felder, 1860
 Cirrochroa menones Semper, 1888
 Cirrochroa niassica Honrath, 1892
 Cirrochroa nicobarica Wood-Mason, 1881
 Cirrochroa orissa C. & R. Felder, 1860 – banded yeoman 
 Cirrochroa recondita Roos, 1996
 Cirrochroa regina C. & R. Felder, 1867
 Cirrochroa satellita Butler, 1869
 Cirrochroa semiramis C. & R. Felder, 1867
 Cirrochroa surya Moore, 1879 – little yeoman
 Cirrochroa thais (Fabricius, 1787) – Tamil yeoman 
 Cirrochroa tyche C. & R. Felder, 1861 – common yeoman 
 Cirrochroa thule C. & R. Felder, 1860

References

External links

Images representing Cirrochroa at EOL
Images representing Cirrochroa at Consortium for the Barcode of Life

Vagrantini
Nymphalidae genera
Taxa named by Edward Doubleday